The Mad Monk ( is a 1993 Hong Kong fantasy comedy film directed by Johnnie To, and starring Stephen Chow as the "Mad Monk" Ji Gong, a popular Chinese folklore figure from the Southern Song Dynasty. The film follows "Dragon Fighter Luohan" as he accepts a challenge from the gods to change the fate of a beggar, a prostitute, and a villain in three heavenly days. He is reborn on earth as a mere mortal and ultimately battles an evil demon to stave off hell on earth.

Plot

The gods in Heaven complain to the Jade Emperor about the malicious practical jokes played on them by Dragon Fighter Lohan. The Emperor summons Dragon, but Tiger Fighter Lohan appears instead to defend his friend. Dragon then appears and rebukes the various gods for their own horrible judgments on mankind, and insists that he can do a better job. The Jade Emperor banishes Dragon and Tiger to be reincarnated as animals, but the Bodhisattva Guan Yin intervenes. Jade Emperor issues Dragon a challenge: if he can change the fates of three people destined to nine incarnations in the same roles — a beggar, a prostitute, and a villain — within three heavenly days, he will not be punished. The Bodhisattva gives Dragon a magical fan to help him in his mission - but Tiger takes the fan away from him moments before he is forced down from heaven.

Dragon is reborn to a couple who visit a Buddhist temple to pray for a child. Tiger enlists the aid of a heavenly soldier named Unicorn to help him take the magical fan to Dragon. When Tiger is reincarnated he is much younger than Dragon has grown. Unicorn uses his magic to make Tiger rapidly age - physically; Tiger's mental abilities remains that of a baby.
Dragon's parents adopt Tiger and treat him as their own son.

Dragon regains his memories when he is struck by lightning during an encounter with Bai Xiao Yu, the prostitute. In short order, he also encounters the beggar Ta Chung and the villain Yuan Ba Tian. When the clouds block the moon and heavenly security is the most relaxed, Tiger regains himself enough to give Dragon the magic fan before being forced to return to Heaven.

Dragon tries to instil dignity to Ta Chung, persuade Xiao Yu to change her trade, and Yuan to turn over a new leaf. After he notices Ta Chung retaining some dignity while in front of Xiao Yu, Dragon arranges a date for the both of them. Yuan attacks Dragon during the date, and goes on to murder Ta Chung. Yuan then forces Dragon to watch while he assaults Xiao Yu. Before Ta Chung dies, he regains his dignity by seeing himself by his own name and not as a beggar.

Dragon retrieves a holy relic called the Golden Skeleton, his body from a former life. He uses it to travel to the underworld where he confronts a demon and trades his skeleton for Ta Chung's soul. The demon keeps both the soul and the holy relic and sends Dragon back to the land of the living. Dragon rushes back to the temple and learns that all of the local gods housed there are leaving; because of Dragon's deal with the demon, they do not want to be associated with him. Dragon seeks out Xiao Yu and promises to marry her if she gives up the sex trade. She agrees, but when Dragon begins to transform into a tree because of a prohibition against gods marrying mortals, she thinks he is playing a joke on her.

Yuan slaughters all the people in the brothel so he can use the blood of 49 people to rid Dragon's relic of its power. Dragon goes to the brothel to confront Yuan and, with the help of Tiger and Unicorn, is able to regain his proper form. Dragon beats up Yuan and discovers that Yuan has been given an invincible body by the demon. Dragon pulls Yuan's heart out to show him that the demon gave him a stone heart. A dying Yuan regrets all the bad things he has done and crushes the stone heart, wishing to be an animal in his next life.

Dragon is given a chance to return to Heaven, but he decides to stay to prevent the demon from bringing destruction to those on Earth. Dragon imbues his power into his holy relic and makes it into golden paint, which he uses to write protective talismans around the temple. The demon blows away the talismans and chases Dragon. While fleeing from the demon, Dragon meets the temple Abbot and asks for his help: the Abbot manages to make the demon laugh and simultaneously open his mouth. Dragon jumps into the demon's mouth while he is laughing and causes the demon to explode and die.

The gods celebrate in Heaven as Dragon has seemingly lost the bet. Guan Yin interrupts the festivities and shows how Dragon has succeeded in changing the fates of the three people: Ta Chung has regained his dignity, Xiao Yu has left prostitution behind and opened a bean curd restaurant, and Yuan has renounced violence to be reborn a pig. Dragon is in the end victorious.

Cast
 Stephen Chow as Ji Gong/Dragon-Fighter Lohan/Lee Xu Yuen
 Maggie Cheung as Bai Xiao Yu, the prostitute
 Anthony Wong as Chu Ta Chung, the beggar
 Kirk Wong as Yuan Ba Tian, the villain
 Ng Man-tat as Tiger Fighter Lohan
 Anita Mui as bodhisattva Guan Yin
 Wong Yat-fei as Unicorn, heavenly soldier
 Philip Chan as Erlang Shen
 Michael Chan as Tudigong
 Nina Paw as Mother of Lee Xu Yuen
 Michelle Sima - Pregnant wife

See also
 Ji Gong, the main character in the film.
 Other media about Ji Gong:
 Ji Gong (TV series), a 1985 Chinese television series starring You Benchang and Lü Liang
 The Legends of Jigong, a 1997 Singaporean television series starring Xie Shaoguang
 The Legend of Crazy Monk, a 2009–2011 three-season Chinese television series starring Benny Chan

References

External links
 
 Hong Kong Cinemagic entry

1993 films
1990s Cantonese-language films
Films directed by Johnnie To
1993 comedy films
Hong Kong comedy films
1990s Hong Kong films